Chunampet Muttukumarasami Mudaliyar was the hereditary zamindar  of Chunampet in Chingleput district and politician who served as a member of the Madras Legislative Council for three consecutive terms from 1904 to 1907. His son Arunachala Mudaliar was a popular politician of the Justice Party.

Notes

References 

 

Members of the Tamil Nadu Legislative Council